Cabruna Island (Isla Cabruna) is a coral island located in the Archipelago of San Bernardo, Gulf of Morrosquillo, Caribbean Sea. It is governed by Colombia, and is a part of the Colombian Bolívar Department.

See also
 Caribbean region of Colombia
 Insular region of Colombia
 List of islands of South America

References

External links

 Isla Cabruna: Colombia. Geographic.org.

Caribbean islands of Colombia